The 2005 El Paso mayoral election was held on May 7 and June 6, 2005, to elect the mayor of El Paso, Texas. It saw the election of John Cook, who unseated incumbent mayor Joe Wardy.

This was the first election held for a newly extended four-year term, as previous elections had been to two-year terms.

Results

First-round

Runoff

References

El Paso mayoral
El Paso
Mayoral elections in El Paso, Texas
Non-partisan elections